Ambika Mohan is an Indian actress known for her work in Malayalam cinema and television series mostly in supporting roles. She made her debut in the film, Meghamalhar (2001) and went on to act in over 300 films.

Filmography

Short films and albums

Television

References

External links

Ambika Mohan at MSI

Living people
Year of birth missing (living people)
Actresses in Malayalam cinema
Actresses from Kerala
Indian film actresses
People from Palakkad district
Actresses in Tamil television
Actresses in Malayalam television
Actresses in Tamil cinema
Actresses in Hindi cinema